Thrilling Publications, also known as Beacon Magazines (1936–37), Better Publications (1937–43) and Standard Magazines (1943–55), was a pulp magazine publisher run by Ned Pines, publishing such titles as Startling Stories and Thrilling Wonder Stories.

Pines became the president of Pines Publications in 1928. Pines folded most of his magazines in 1955 but continued to lead the company until 1961.

Cover artists
Pines' cover artists included Earle K. Bergey, John Parker, George Rozen, and Rudolph Belarski.

Paperbacks
In 1942 Pines started Popular Library, a paperback publishing house, and devoted himself to that company after closing his other ventures. Popular reprinted materials from the pulps.

Characters

 The Black Bat
 Captain Danger
 Captain Future (a separate comic book character, unrelated to the pulp character, also existed)
 Crimson Mask
 Green Ghost (also appeared in comics)
 Masked Detective
 Masked Rider (purchased from Martin Goodman's Ranger Publications after the first three issues; Better Publications' numbering started with v01n01)
 The Phantom Detective
 The Purple Scar
 The Rio Kid

Titles
 Air War
 Army Navy Flying Stories
 Black Book Detective
 Captain Future (1940–1944; 17 issues)(the series was continued with several novels and short stories in Startling Stories)
 Detective Book Magazine
 Detective Novels
 Everyday Astrology
 Exciting Detective
 Exciting Love
 Exciting Football
 Exciting Western
 Fantastic Story Quarterly / Fantastic Story Magazine (1950-1955, 23 issues)
 G-Men
 The Lone Eagle
 Masked Detective (1940–1943, 12 issues)
 Masked Rider Western (1934–1953; 100 issues)
 Mobsters
 The Phantom Detective
 Popular Detective
 Popular Love
 Popular Sports Magazine
 Popular Western
 RAF Aces
 Range Riders Western (1938–1953; 72 issues)
 Rio Kid Western
 Rodeo Romances 
 Sky Fighters
 Space Stories (1952-1953, 5 issues)
 Startling Stories (1939–1955; 99 issues)(Following the cancellation of Captain Future in 1944 due to wartime paper restrictions, several CF novels appeared in this magazine immediately, and several short stories in the early 50s)
 Strange Stories (1939-1941, 13 issues)
 The Rio Kid Western (1939–1953; 76 issues)
 Texas Rangers
 Thrilling Adventures (1931–1943)
 Thrilling Baseball
 Thrilling Detective (1931–53; 213 issues)
 Thrilling Football
 Thrilling Love
 Thrilling Mystery
 Thrilling Ranch
 Thrilling Sports
 Thrilling Western
 West
 Thrilling Wonder Stories (1936–55, 112 issues)
 Wonder Story Annual (1950-1953, 4 issues)

See also
Standard Comics - Pines' comic book company, also used the Better Publications name for some titles
Popular Library - Pines' paperback book company

References

Sources
 Wooley, John and Locke, John. "A History of the Thrilling Pulps." Thrilling Detective Heroes [Adventure House, 2007].

External links

Popular Library titles

Pulp magazine publishing companies of the United States
Defunct magazines published in the United States
Pulp fiction
Fantasy fiction magazines
Magazines established in 1928
Magazines disestablished in 1961